In enzymology, a glutathionylspermidine amidase is an enzyme that catalyzes the chemical reaction

glutathionylspermidine + H2O  glutathione + spermidine

Thus, the two substrates of this enzyme are glutathionylspermidine and H2O, whereas its two products are glutathione and spermidine.

This enzyme belongs to the family of hydrolases, those acting on carbon-nitrogen bonds other than peptide bonds, specifically in linear amides.  The systematic name of this enzyme class is gamma-L-glutamyl-L-cysteinyl-glycine:spermidine amidase. This enzyme is also called glutathionylspermidine amidohydrolase (spermidine-forming).  This enzyme participates in glutathione metabolism.

Structural studies

References

 

EC 3.5.1
Enzymes of known structure